Agiliway is a custom software development and consulting company with offices in Austin (Texas), Lviv, Chernivtsi (Ukraine), and Krakow (Poland).

History 
Agiliway was founded in 2015. In 2018, Agiliway released its first product – a mobile application for CiviCRM catering to the needs of NGOs and non-profit organizations called CiviMobile.

The application has a number of major releases and is available in ten different languages: English, German, French, Italian, Spanish, Colombian Spanish, Dutch, Hungarian, Ukrainian and Polish.
 
In December 2021, Agiliway donated new technical equipment to the Department of Information Systems and Networks of Lviv Polytechnic National University.

References

Sources 
 Офіційний сайт CiviMobile

External links
 Functional or object-oriented programming: what to choose and why you should pay attention to Clojure. Tips for beginners (Функціональне чи об’єктно-орієнтоване програмування: що обрати і чому варто звернути свою увагу на Clojure. Поради для початківців)
 Starlink connection experience: procedure, settings, speed (Досвід підключення до Starlink: процедура, налаштування, швидкість)
 How Easter unites Ukrainians during the war. Short stories from Agiliway (Як Великдень єднає українців під час війни. Короткі історії від Agiliway)
 Where I come from: The story of my embroidery. The Agiliway team talks about their holiday shirts (Звідки я родом: Історія моєї вишиванки. Команда Agiliway розповідає про свої святкові сорочки)
 Agiliway Agiliway Poland: New Development Center and More Opportunities 
 Ukrainian IT Market on the Spotlight of Geopolitics Issues
 IT Industry Role in Ukrainian GDP 
 How does Agiliway develop software to improve food security? (Jak Agiliway rozwija oprogramowanie, aby ulepszyć bazę dostaw żywności?)
 Agiliway Polska: New Development Center and More Opportunities (Agiliway Polska: Nowe centrum rozwoju i więcej możliwości)
 Working during the war is the company's experience in the IT industry (Робота під час війни – досвід компанії з ІТ-галузі)

Software companies of the United States
Software companies of Ukraine